is a junction railway station in the town of  Takanezawa, Tochigi, Japan, operated by East Japan Railway Company (JR East). The station building was designed by Kengo Kuma and Associates. The station is also a freight terminal for the Japan Freight Railway Company (JR Freight).

Lines

Station layout
The station has an elevated station building, with one side platform and one island platform underneath. The station has a Midori no Madoguchi staffed ticket office.

Platforms

History

Hōshakuji Station opened on 21 October 1899. With the privatization of Japanese National Railways (JNR) on 1 April 1987, the station came under the control of JR East.

Passenger statistics
In fiscal 2019, the station was used by an average of 2251 passengers daily (boarding passengers only). The passenger figures for previous years are as shown below.

Surrounding area
Takanezawa Town Hall
Takanezawa Post Office
 
Kinugawa River

Gallery

See also
 List of railway stations in Japan

References

External links

 JR East station information 

Railway stations in Tochigi Prefecture
Railway stations in Japan opened in 1899
Karasuyama Line
Utsunomiya Line
Takanezawa, Tochigi
Stations of East Japan Railway Company
Stations of Japan Freight Railway Company